Walter Ledgard (25 October 1915 – 8 March 1999) was a Peruvian swimmer. He competed in the men's 400 metre freestyle at the 1936 Summer Olympics.

References

1915 births
1999 deaths
Peruvian male freestyle swimmers
Sportspeople from Lima
Olympic swimmers of Peru
Swimmers at the 1936 Summer Olympics
20th-century Peruvian people